The 2017 Tour of Flanders for Women was the 14th running of the Tour of Flanders for Women, a women's bicycle race in Belgium.

After a four-rider move was caught with  remaining, the race ended in a bunch sprint of 19 riders; for the second time in three World Tour races, it was American rider Coryn Rivera that was the victor as the first American to win an edition of the Tour of Flanders, edging out Australia's Gracie Elvin from the  team who was the first Australian to podium at this race, while the podium was completed by  rider Chantal Blaak from the Netherlands.

Route

The first  wound through the hills of the Zwalm region, before addressing the climbs in the Flemish Ardennes between Geraardsbergen and Oudenaarde. There were 12 categorised climbs and five sectors of flat cobbled roads.

Categorised climbs and cobbles

Teams
28 teams competed in the race.

Result

References

External links

2017
Tour
2017 UCI Women's World Tour